in Kōchi is a Japanese voice actress.

Filmography

Anime
Animation Runner Kuromi (Announcer, Yuri)
Animation Runner Kuromi 2 (Yuri)
Battle B-Daman (Asado)
Boys Be... (Jyunna Morio)
Futari wa Pretty Cure (Butler Zakenna A)
Futari wa Pretty Cure Max Heart (Pyuan)
Hijikata Toshizou - Shiro no Kiseki (Hijikata Toshizou (child))
Kirby: Right Back at Ya! (Bun)
Mamotte Shugogetten (Letter (ep.7), resident (ep.8))
Matantei Loki Ragnarok (Reiya Ooshima)
Mythical Detective Loki Ragnarok (Reiya Ohshima)
Cyborg Kuro-chan (Kotaro)
Nessa no Haou Gandalla (Emma Branton)
Odenkun (Chikuwabu, Ginnan bouzu, Susie)
Ojarumaru (Kintarou Sakata (ep.181-270))
One Piece (Chabo, Marie)
Shin Hakkenden (Noburu)
SD Gundam Sangokuden Brave Battle Warriors (Kan-pei Gundam)
Tokyo Mew Mew (Lucha, Pudding's mother (ep.20))
Yu-Gi-Oh! (Female student, Kaoruko Bodyguard (ep.19))

Miscellaneous
Deep Fear drama CD (Sharon State)
Tokyo Mew Mew (songs performance: My Sweet Heart (OP), Glider, My Days ~Ano Hi wo Wasurenai~, Hello Brand-New Love ~Koi wa Sugi Soko~)

Videogames
Dynasty Warriors and Warriors Orochi series (Diaochan)
Dream Mix TV: World Fighters (Kiji)
Dream Mix TV: World Fighters (Minibonbi)
Dream Mix TV: World Fighters (Momotaro)
Riviera -Yakusoku no Chi-" (Rose)
Rune Factory Frontier (Lucia/Minerva)
Growlanser & Growlanser II: The Sense of Justice (Louise Fallsmeyer)

Dubbing
Dynasty Warriors (Diaochan (Gulnazar))

References

External links

Rika Komatsu at Aoni Production.

Living people
Voice actors from Kōchi Prefecture
Japanese voice actresses
1975 births
Aoni Production voice actors